Elizabeth Wycliffe (born March 14, 1983 in Thousand Oaks, California), sometimes known as Liz Wycliffe, is a female swimmer from Canada, who was born in the United States. She is a backstroke and freestyle specialist. A resident of Kingston, Ontario, she claimed three medals at the 2007 Pan American Games in Rio de Janeiro, Brazil.

References
Profile Canadian Olympic Committee

1983 births
Living people
Texas Longhorns women's swimmers
People from Thousand Oaks, California
Sportspeople from Kingston, Ontario
Swimmers at the 2002 Commonwealth Games
Swimmers at the 2007 Pan American Games
Canadian female backstroke swimmers
Canadian female freestyle swimmers
Pan American Games silver medalists for Canada
Pan American Games bronze medalists for Canada
Pan American Games medalists in swimming
Sportspeople from Ventura County, California
Medalists at the 2007 Pan American Games
Commonwealth Games competitors for Canada